Brébeuf is a parish municipality in the Laurentides region of Quebec, Canada, part of Les Laurentides Regional County Municipality. It is located along the Rouge River (Rivière Rouge), near Mont-Tremblant.

Demographics 

Population:
 Population in 2021: 1,009 (2016 to 2021 population change: 3.4%)
 Population in 2016: 976 
 Population in 2011: 1,012 
 Population in 2006: 939
 Population in 2001: 800
 Population in 1996: 695
 Population in 1991: 609

Mother tongue:
 English as first language: 3%
 French as first language: 96%
 English and French as first language: 0%
 Other as first language: 1%

Education

Sir Wilfrid Laurier School Board operates English-language schools:
 Arundel Elementary School in Arundel
 Sainte Agathe Academy (for high school only) in Sainte-Agathe-des-Monts

References

External links
 Official site

Parish municipalities in Quebec
Incorporated places in Laurentides